Chantal Alicia Raymond (born November 10, 1985) is a Jamaican model and beauty pageant titleholder who was the winner of the Miss Jamaica World 2010 beauty pageant. She represented Jamaica at the Miss World 2010 contest held in Sanya, China on October 30, 2010. After Miss Jamaica World, Raymond appeared in commercials for brands such as Lincoln Motor Company and AT&T. She also appeared in a 2017 episode of House Hunters International.

Education 

Raymond currently holds a Bachelor of Science Degree from the University of Florida College of Journalism and Communications and a Juris Doctor from Harvard Law School.  While a student at Harvard, Raymond completed an international Political and Economic Internship with the U.S. Department of State.

One of Raymond's most notable achievements was obtaining nine undergraduate academic scholarships to complete her degree. She was also the youngest student in her high school graduating class, allowing her to begin full-time study at the University of Florida at only 16 years old.

Career 

Raymond is presently CEO & Founder of Inclusive Legal Search. Inclusive Legal Search is a national legal recruiting firm with an emphasis on diversity recruiting.

Raymond has been featured in Bloomberg Law, Business Insider, The ABA Journal, Law360, Law.com and Above The Law, as well as other local and international publications. She is a 40 Under 40 National Bar Association honoree and was featured on the 2021 Forbes Next 1000 list of inspiring entrepreneurs and small business leaders.

References

External links 

 

1985 births
Jamaican female models
Living people
Miss Jamaica World winners
Jamaican beauty pageant winners
Miss World 2010 delegates
Harvard Law School alumni
University of Florida College of Journalism and Communications alumni